Chicago typewriter may refer to:
Chicago Typewriter (TV series)
Thompson submachine gun